Emil Hansen (2 August 1893 – 25 September 1971) was a Norwegian footballer. He played in five matches for the Norway national football team from 1916 to 1917.

References

External links
 

1893 births
1971 deaths
Norwegian footballers
Norway international footballers
Place of birth missing
Association footballers not categorized by position